This is a list of reggae music compilations.  It includes LP and CD compilations featuring music from the various styles of reggae, including mento, ska, rocksteady, early/roots reggae, dub, and dancehall, etc.

List of compilations

A
Arkology

B
Bellyas
Black Lion Reggae Invasion Vol. 1
Blunted in the Bomb Shelter

C
Caribbean Connection

D
Diwali Riddim

G
Gloria Riddim
Greensleeves Rhythm Album

H
The Harder They Come

I
Intouch Riddim

K
Kopa Riddim
Korak napred 2 koraka nazad

M
The Mighty Two

N
Now That's What I Call Reggae

O
Open the Iron Gate: 1973–77

R
Ragarap
Raggamuffin Vol 1
Raggamuffin Vol 2
Reggae Gold 1998
Reggae Gold 2012
Reggae Golden Jubilee
Riddim Driven (series)
Roots to the Bone

S
Strictly The Best vol. 46
Strictly The Best vol. 47

T
The Time Has Come: The Best of Ziggy Marley & the Melody Makers
This Is Reggae Music: The Golden Era 1960-1975
Trojan Box Set series

V
Voice of Jamaica, Vol.3

W
Watch How the People Dancing: Unity Sounds from the London Dancehall 1986–1989

See also

 Reggae
 Reggae festivals
 Reggae genres

Reggae

Reggae